The Third Pandemic is a hard science fiction novel by Pierre Ouellette. It is more specifically a medical thriller with perspectives from both humans living with a virulent disease and from the virus's point of view.

External links
 Plot summary

1996 American novels
1996 science fiction novels
American science fiction novels
Medical novels
Hard science fiction